Ohio is a Midwestern state in the Great Lakes region of the United States. The state takes its name from the Ohio River, whose name in turn originated from the Seneca word  ohiːyo', meaning "good river", "great river" or "large creek". The Ohio River forms its southern border, though nearly all of the river itself belongs to Kentucky and West Virginia.

Significant rivers within the state include the Cuyahoga River, Great Miami River, Maumee River, Muskingum River, and Scioto River. The rivers in the northern part of the state drain into the northern Atlantic Ocean via Lake Erie and the St. Lawrence River, and the rivers in the southern part of the state drain into the Gulf of Mexico via the Ohio River and then the Mississippi.

The worst weather disaster in Ohio history occurred along the Great Miami River in 1913. Known as the Great Dayton Flood, the entire Miami River watershed flooded, including the downtown business district of Dayton. As a result, the Miami Conservancy District was created as the first major flood plain engineering project in Ohio and the United States.

Alphabetically

Alum Creek
Ashtabula River
Auglaize River
Beaver Creek (Lorain County, Ohio)
Beaver Creek (Raccoon Creek tributary)
Big Creek
Big Darby Creek
Big Walnut Creek
Black Fork Mohican River
Black River
Blacklick Creek
Blanchard River
Brandywine Creek (Broken Sword Creek tributary)
Brandywine Creek (Cuyahoga River tributary)
Brandywine Creek (Miami River tributary)
Brandywine Creek (Tuscarawas River tributary)
Brewster Creek
Broken Sword Creek
Buck Creek (feeds Clarence J. Brown Reservoir)
Captina Creek
Chagrin River
Chippewa Creek (Cuyahoga River tributary)
Chippewa Creek (Tuscarawas River tributary)
Clear Creek
Clear Fork Mohican River
Conneaut Creek
Conotton Creek
Cuyahoga River
Duck Creek
Euclid Creek
Federal Creek
Flatrock Creek
Grand River
Great Miami River (Miami River tributary)
Green Creek
Greenville Creek
Harkers Run
Hemlock Creek
Hocking River
Huff Run
Huron River
Killbuck Creek
Kingsbury Run
Kinnikinnick Creek
Kokosing River
Lake Fork Mohican River
Leading Creek
Leatherwood Creek (Tawana Creek tributary)
Leatherwood Creek (Wills Creek tributary)
Licking River
Little Auglaize River
Little Beaver Creek
Little Beaver Creek (Lorain County, Ohio)
Little Cuyahoga River
Little Darby Creek
Little Hocking River
Little Miami River
Little Muskingum River
Little Ottawa River
Little Sandusky River
Little Scioto River (Ohio River tributary)
Little Scioto River (Scioto River tributary)
Little Wakatomika Creek
Loramie Creek
Mad River
Mahoning River
Margaret Creek
Maumee River
Mill Creek
Mississinewa River
Mohican River
Monday Creek
Moxahala Creek
Muskingum River
Nimishillen Creek
Ohio Brush Creek
Ohio River
Olentangy River
Ottawa River (Auglaize River tributary)
Ottawa River (Lake Erie) (Toledo)
Paint Creek
Pee Pee Creek
Portage River
Raccoon Creek
Rattlesnake Creek
Rocky River
St. Joseph River
St. Marys River
Sandusky River
Sandy Creek
Scioto River
Shade River
Shenango River
Slabcamp Run
Slate Run
Solomon Run
Still Fork
Stillwater River
Styx River
Sugar Creek (Ottawa River tributary)
Sugar Creek (Tuscarawas River tributary)
Sunday Creek
Symmes Creek
Sycamore Creek

Tiffin River
Tinkers Creek
Toussaint River (Ohio)
Turtle Creek
Tuscarawas River
Vermilion River
Wabash River
Wakatomika Creek
Walhonding River
Wheeling Creek
Whitewater River
Wills Creek
Wolf Creek (Great Miami River tributary)
Wolf Creek (Muskingum River tributary)

By tributary

Lake Erie
Bear Creek
Little Bear Creek
Halfway Creek
Shantee Creek
Silver Creek

Ottawa River
Ottawa River
Sibley Creek
Tenmile Creek
North Branch Tenmile Creek
Prairie Ditch

Maumee River
Maumee River
Duck Creek
Swan Creek
Wolf Creek
Cairl Creek
Blue Creek
Mosquito Creek
Harris Ditch
Gail Run
Ai Creek
Delaware Creek
Grassy Creek
Tontogany Creek
Kettle Run
Beaver Creek
Little Beaver Creek
Cutoff Ditch
Brush Creek
Yellow Creek
West Creek
Little Yellow Creek
East Beaver Creek
West Beaver Creek
Big Creek
Lick Creek
Bad Creek
South Branch Bad Creek
Dry Creek
School Creek
Turkeyfoot Creek
Lost Creek
Brush Creek
West Creek
Mess Ditch
Gustwiller Ditch
Brickman Ditch
North Turkeyfoot Creek
Konzen Ditch
Obernouse Creek
Van Hyning Creek
Garrett Creek
Benien Creek
Brubaker Creek
Barnes Creek
Wade Creek
Huston Creek
Preston Run
Auglaize River
Powell Creek
Wagner Run
North Powell Creek
Hogback Run
South Powell Creek
Threemile Creek
Jackson Ditch
Beetree Creek
Fivemile Creek
Eagle Creek
Sixmile Creek
Bull Creek
Little Flatrock Creek
Flatrock Creek
Wildcat Creek
Blue Creek
Barcer Run
Webster Ditch
Cunningham Creek
Buchanan Ditch
Upper Prairie Creek
Parker Ditch
Sponseller Ditch
Little Auglaize River
Prairie Creek
West Branch Prairie Creek
Hog Run
Hoaglin Creek
Monkey Run
Dog Run
Hagerman Creek
Dry Creek
Middle Branch Little Auglaize River
Maddox Creek
Balyeat Ditch
Sheets Ditch
Town Creek
Roller Creek
Dog Creek
Emmit Bell Ditch
Spice Run
Bandehoff Ditch
Dry Run
Hermann Ditch
Benson Ditch
Wolf Ditch
Long Prairie Creek
Kyle Prairie Ditch
Greens Ditch
Frisinger Ditch
Prairie Creek
Blanchard River
Ottawa River
Little Ottawa River
Hog Creek
Tiffin River
Lick Creek
St. Joseph River
St. Marys River
Black Creek
Clear Creek

Otter Creek
Wolf Creek
Cedar Creek
Dry Creek
Little Cedar Creek
Crane Creek
Ayers Creek
Little Crane Creek
Henry Creek
Two Root Creek
Turtle Creek
North Branch Turtle Creek
South Branch Turtle Creek

Toussaint River (Ohio)
Toussaint River (Ohio)
Rusha Creek
Toussaint Creek
Packer Creek

Portage River (Ohio)
Portage River
Little Portage River
Cottonwood Swale
Ninemile Creek
Indian Creek
Green Bayou
Bayou Creek
Lacarpe Creek
Wolf Creek
Sugar Creek
Victoria Creek
Middle Branch Portage River
North Branch Portage River
Yankey Creek
Cuckle Creek
South Branch Portage River
East Branch Portage River
South Branch East Branch Portage River
Bull Creek
Rocky Ford
Needles Creek
Rader Creek

Sandusky River
Sandusky River
Green Creek
Yellow Slough
Flag Run
Beaver Creek
Owl Creek
Westerhouse Ditch
Albreight Ditch
Noel Ditch
Emerson Creek
Royer Ditch
Bark Creek
Muskellunge Creek
Indian Creek
Wolf Creek
East Branch Wolf Creek
Snuff Creek
East Fork East Branch Wolf Creek
Middle Fork East Branch Wolf Creek
Sugar Creek
Spicer Creek
Morrison Creek
Willow Creek
Rock Creek
East Branch Rock Creek
Armstrong and Beighly Ditch
Carpenter Ditch
Gibson Creek
Bells Run
Honey Creek
Buckeye Creek
Silver Creek
Eicholtz Ditch
Kagy Ditch
Bollinger Ditch
Hedden Ditch
Hooper Ditch
Schaaf Ditch
Brokenknife Creek
Mile Run
Sycamore Creek
Greasy Run
Taylor Run
Thorn Run
Tymochtee Creek
Spring Run
Poverty Run
No. 32 Ditch
Little Tymochtee Creek
Hart Ditch
Browns Run
Veith Ditch
Lick Run
Baughman Run
Blake Ditch
Perkins Run
Oak Run
Sugar Run
Warpole Creek
Saint James Run
Little Tymochtee Creek
Revhorn Run
Pawpaw Run
PawPaw Run
Carroll Ditch
Enoch Creek
Prairie Run
Thompson Ditch
Layton Ditch
Sugar Run
Negro Run
Spring Branch
Kiser Run
Porcupine Creek
Cranberry Run
Rock Run
Little Sandusky River
Honey Run
Broken Sword Creek
Indian Run
Brandywine Creek (Broken Sword Creek tributary)
Red Run
Grass Run
Gray Eye Run
Loss Creek
Paramour Creek
Allen Run
South Creek
Racoon Creek
Pickerel Creek
Strong Creek
Fuller Creek
Little Pickerel Creek
Cold Creek
Mills Creek
Pipe Creek
Plum Brook
Sawmill Creek

Huron River
Huron River
Mud Brook
East Branch Huron River
Cole Creek
Norwalk Creek
West Branch Huron River
Seymour Creek
Megginson Creek
Frink Run
Haas Ditch
Schoeffel Ditch
Slate Run
Mud Run
Mud Run
Shriner Ditch
Marsh Run
Old Woman Creek
Cranberry Creek
Chappel Creek
Sugar Creek
Darby Creek
Sherod Creek

Vermilion River
Vermilion River
East Fork Vermilion River
East Branch Vermilion River
Indian Creek
Southwest Branch Vermilion River
Buck Creek
Clear Creek
Brownhelm Creek
Quarry Creek
Beaver Creek
Martin Run

Black River
Black River
Ziegman Ditch
French Creek
Jungbluth Ditch
Walker Ditch
Kline Ditch
Avins Ditch
Klingsburn Ditch
Slater Ditch
Ridgeway Ditch
East Branch Black River
Willow Creek
Fortune Ditch
Salt Creek
Crow Creek
Coon Creek
East Fork East Branch Black River
West Fork East Branch Black River
Clear Creek
West Branch Black River
Straw Ditch
Schroeder Ditch
Dant Ditch
Elk Creek
Kelner Ditch
Squires Ditch
Plum Creek
Wellington Creek
Ponderosa Pines Lake
Findley Lake
Charlemont Creek
Buck Creek
Schumaker Ditch
Powdermaker Ditch
Heider Ditch
Gable Ditch
Porter Creek
Cahoon Creek
Sperry Creek
Tuttle Creek
Willow Creek

Rocky River
Rocky River
West Channel Rocky River
Abram Creek (Rocky River, Lake Erie)
East Branch Rocky River
Baldwin Creek
Healey Creek
Big Brook
Willow Brook
West Branch Rocky River
Plum Creek (Rocky River, Lake Erie)
Baker Creek (Rocky River, Lake Erie)
Blodgett Creek
Cossett Creek
Mallet Creek
North Branch West Branch Rocky River
Plum Creek (Rocky River, Lake Erie)
Remson Creek
Granger Ditch
South Branch Rocky River

Cuyahoga River
Cuyahoga River
Old River
Kingsbury Run
Morgan Run
Burk Branch
Big Creek
Countrymans Creek
West Creek
Mill Creek

Tinkers Creek
Tinkers Creek
Beaver Meadow Run
Hawthorne Creek
Hemlock Creek
Neptune Lake
Pond Brook
Wood Creek
Chippewa Creek

Brandywine Creek
Brandywine Creek (Cuyahoga River tributary)
Indian Creek
Stanford Run
Grannys Run
Slipper Run
Boston Run
Haskell Run
Ritchie Run
Salt Run
Dickerson Run
Langes Run
Robinson Run
Furnace Run
Riding Run
Yellow Creek
North Fork Yellow Creek
Woodward Creek
Sand Run
Mud Brook
Woodward Creek
Old Mill Pond
Powers Brook
Little Cuyahoga River
Springfield Lake Outlet
Wingfoot Lake Outlet
Fish Creek
Plum Creek
Breakneck Creek (Cuyahoga River tributary)
Potter Creek
Black Brook
Sawyer Brook
Bridge Creek
West Branch Cuyahoga River
Butternut Creek
Tare Creek

Doan Brook
Doan Brook
Wade Lagoon
Fairmont Reservoir
Baldwin Reservoir
Lower Shaker Lake
Upper Shaker Lake
Blue Rock Brook
Walnut Creek
Ninemile Creek

Euclid Creek
Euclid Creek
East Branch
Claribel Creek
Stevenson Brook
Verbsky Creek
Redstone Run

Chagrin River
Chagrin River
East Branch Chagrin River
Griswold Creek
Willey Creek
Aurora Branch
McFarland Creek
Silver Creek
Beaver Creek

Marsh Creek
Marsh Creek
Heisley Creek

Grand River
Grand River
Black Brook
Caroline Creek
Pebble Branch
Red Creek
Big Creek
Kellogg Creek
Ellison Creek
Gordon Creek
East Creek
Aylworth Creek
Jenks Creek
Cutts Creek
Paine Creek
Bates Creek
Phelps Creek
Talcott Creek
Griswold Creek
Mill Creek
Coffee Creek
Center Creek
Mill Creek
Griggs Creek
Askme Run
Peters Creek
Bronson Creek
Trumbull Creek
Spring Creek
Three Brothers Creek
Badger Run
Rock Creek
Plum Creek
Sugar Creek
Whetstone Creek
Lebanon Creek
Shanty Creek
Crooked Creek
Mud Creek
Hoskins Creek
Indian Creek
Montville Ditch
Phelps Creek
Petersen Creek 
North Branch Phelps Creek
South Branch Phelps Creek
Mill Creek
Garden Creek
Swine Creek
Grapevine Creek
Andrews Creek
Plum Creek
Coffee Creek
Baughman Creek
Center Creek
Mud Run
Dead Branch
McKinley Creek
Big Creek
Wheeler Creek
Cowles Creek
Indian Creek
Red Brook

Ashtabula River
Ashtabula River
Fields Brook
Strong Brook
Hubbard Run
Ashtabula Creek
West Branch Ashtabula River
East Branch Ashtabula River

Conneaut Creek
Conneaut Creek
West Branch Conneaut Creek
East Branch Conneaut Creek
Middle Branch Conneaut Creek
Stone Run
Fish Creek
Turkey Creek

Ohio River

Wabash River
Wabash River
Mississinewa River
Jordan Ditch
Grays Branch
Hickory Branch
Scherman Ditch
Beaver Creek
Big Run
Brush Run
Little Beaver Creek
Little Bear Creek
Buck Run
Herden Creek
Coldwater Creek
Burntwood Creek
Beaver Creek
Darlinghaus Ditch
Crab Branch
Toti Creek
Stony Creek
Twomile Creek
Threemile Creek
Vandenbush Ditch
Ward Ditch
Bear Creek

Great Miami River
Great Miami River
Doublelick Run
Whitewater River
Sand Run
Dry Fork
Lee Creek
Howard Creek
Sater Run
Phillips Creek
Jamison Creek
East Fork Whitewater River
Elkhorn Creek
Mud Creek
Horn Ditch
Rocky Fork
Little Creek
Brinley Fork
Jocqueway Fork
Dry Run
Jordan Creek
Taylor Creek
Paddys Run
Bluerock Creek
Owl Creek
Dunlap Creek
Dry Run
Indian Creek
Salmon Run
Banklick Creek
Pleasant Run
Crawford Run
Twomile Creek
Fourmile Creek
Sevenmile Creek
Ninemile Creek
Big Cave Run
Rush Run
Paint Creek
Opossum Run
Sugar Run
Beasley Run
Pottenger Run
Rocky Run
Crumbaker Run
Bull Run
Harkers Run
Spring Run
Little Fourmile Creek
East Fork Talawanda Creek
Harris Run
Gregory Creek
Coldwater Creek
Dicks Creek
North Branch Dicks Creek
Shaker Creek
Millers Creek
Elk Creek
Browns Run
Twin Creek
Little Twin Creek
Toms Run
Wysong Run
Aukerman Run
Bantas Run
Goose Creek
Lowry Run
Lesley Run
Coffman Run
Price Creek
Jims Run
Swamp Creek
Millers Fork
Lick Run
Dry Fork
Clear Creek
Gander Run
Goose Creek
Dry Run
Crains Run
Sycamore Creek
Bear Creak
Little Bear Creek
Garber Run
Diehl Run
Lick Run
Spring Run
Opossum Creek
Holes Creek
Honey Creek
Wolf Creek
Dry Run
North Branch Wolf Creek
Razor Run
Poplar Run
Mad River
Buck Creek
Stillwater River
Greenville Creek
Loramie Creek
Tawana Creek
Muchinippi Creek
Calico Creek
Wolf Creek
Little Muchinippi Creek
Baughman Ditch
Jackson Center Ditch
Willow Creek
Cherokee Run
South Fork Great Miami River
Slow Ditch
North Fork Great Miami River
Blackhawk Run
Van Horn Creek
Muddy Creek
Rapid Run

Mill Creek
Mill Creek
West Fork Mill Creek
Ross Run
Fox Run
Sharon Creek
East Fork Mill Creek

Little Miami River
Little Miami River
East Fork Little Miami River
Solomon Run
Turtle Creek
Halls Creek
Todd Fork
First Creek
Caesar Creek
Massies Creek

Fivemile Creek
Fivemile Creek
Eightmile Creek
Tenmile Creek
Ninemile Creek
Pond Run
Twelvemile Creek
Fagin Run
Ferguson Run
Briggs Run
Little Indian Creek
Boat Run
Indian Creek
Dry Run
Colclaser Run
Sugar Creek
North Fork Indian Creek
South Fork Indian Creek
Bee Run
Little Indian Creek
Ray Run
Maple Creek
Vinegar Run
Bear Creek
Crooked Run
Patterson Run
Ryan Run
Bullskin Creek
Big Run
Slickaway Run
East Branch Bullskin Creek
Middle Branch Bullskin Creek
West Branch Bullskin Creek
Painter Fork
Moon Hollow Run
Miranda Run
Hog Run

Whiteoak Creek
Whiteoak Creek
Big Run
Lyon Run
Boat Run
Cochran Run
Ross Run
Opossum Run
Town Run
Walnut Creek
Indian Run
Unity Creek
Miranda Run
Shot Pouch Run
Sterling Run
Snapping Turtle Run
Plum Creek
Goose Run
East Fork Whiteoak Creek
Turkeyhole Run
Browns Run
Middle Run
Slabcamp Run
Twin Run
Bells Run
Plum Run
Sugar Run
North Fork Whiteoak Creek
Flat Run
Brush Run
Yellow Run
Ruble Run
Indian Run
Little North Fork Whiteoak Creek
Lick Run
Stony Branch
Barr Run
Straight Creek
Sink Creek
Rangle Run
Sheep Run
Campbell Run
Evans Run
Brady Run
Washburn Run
Bull Run
Scott Run
Camp Run
Myers Run
Rocky Run
Honey Run
West Fork Straight Creek
Buck Run
Sycamore Run
Levanna Branch
Cornick Run
Myers Run
Redoak Creek
West Fork Redoak Creek
Sutherland Run

Eagle Creek
Eagle Creek
Baylor Run
Beetle Creek
Lafferty Run
Indian Lick
Brushy Fork
Suck Run
Wild Duck Branch
East Fork Eagle Creek
Town Branch
Washburn Run
Ada Run
Hills Fork
Lick Run
Gordon Run
Hannah Run
West Fork Eagle Creek
Rattlesnake Creek
Northwest Fork Eagle Creek
Threemile Creek
Slickaway Run
Big Run
Dry Run
Morley Run
Fishing Gut Creek
Little Threemile Creek
Lickskillet Branch
Buzzardroost Creek
Elk Run
McClelland Run
Bradford Run
Isaacs Creek
Island Creek
Lindsey Creek
Ellison Run
Donaldson Run
Cummings Creek
Lower Sister Creek
Upper Sister Creek
Spring Run

Ohio Brush Creek
Ohio Brush Creek
Asher Run
Waggoner Run
Mackenzie Run
Black Run
Beasley Fork
Moore Run
Soldiers Run
Easter Run
Cedar Run
Semple Run
Lick Fork
Treber Run
Cave Run
Bundle Run
West Fork Ohio Brush Creek
Spoon River
Georges Creek
Big Run
Cherry Fork
Grace Run
Martins Run
Gregg Run
Buck Run
Little West Fork Ohio Brush Creek
Elk Fork
Turkey Run
Shimer Run
Little East Fork Ohio Brush Creek
Wolf Creek
Crooked Creek
Weasel Run
Baker Fork
Middle Fork
Cow Run
Setty Branch
Cox Branch
Straight Creek
Muddy Fork
Kerr Run
Flat Run
Elm Run
Elk Run
Bee Run
Rock Lick
Lost Fork
Alex Run
Smokey Creek
Stout Run
Cattail Run
Russell Fork
Tracey Run
Puntenney Run
Southdown Fork
Pine Fork
Black Walnut Fork
Long Lick Run
Wikoff Run
Sulphur Creek
Little Sulphur Creek
Gilpen Creek
McCall Run
Rock Run
Lower Twin Creek
Sugarcamp Run
Vastine Run
Upper Twin Creek
Boland Run
Dry Run
Tucker Run
East Fork Upper Twin Creek
Jake Run
Bald Knob Run
Brushy Fork
Horner Branch
Moore Run
Spencer Run
McAtee Run
Old Pond Run
Mundy Run
Pond Run
East Fork Pond Run
Middle Fork Pond Run
Grass Lick Run
McBride Run
Gabe Run
Brushy Fork
Nace Run
Turkey Creek
Brouse Run
Vaughters Run
Stony Run
Lower Lick Stony Run
Upper Lick Stony Run
Worley Run
Rabbit Run
Odell Run
Pond Lick Run
Rock Lick
Brush Fork
Wes Run
Barbara Run
Buck Lick
Harber Fork
Mackletree Run
Plummer Fork
Lampblack Run
Old Lade Run
Scantling Run
Rock Lick
Wolfden Run
Carey Run
Bellamy Run
Slab Run
Lousy Run
Hyggen Run

Scioto River
Scioto River
Scioto Brush Creek
Salt Creek
Paint Creek
Rattlesnake Creek
Kinnikinnick Creek
Big Darby Creek
Walnut Creek
Big Walnut Creek
Alum Creek
Blacklick Creek
Olentangy River
Little Scioto River (tributary of Scioto River tributary)
Honey Creek
Rock Fork
Long Branch
Zeig Ditch
Rush Creek
McDonald Creek
Dudley Run
Big Swale
Rocky Fork
Wildcat Creek
Ash Run
South Wildcat Creek
Panther Creek
Jims Creek
Wolf Creek
Garwood Creek
Gander Run
Manlove Run
Taylor Creek
Silver Creek
Jordan Run
Batchlet Run
Payden Run
McCoy Run
Cooney Ditch
Cottonwood Ditch
Twin Branches
Dunlap Creek
Elder Creek
Poe Ditch
Wallace Fork
Munn Run

Little Scioto River (tributary of Ohio River tributary)
Little Scioto River (tributary of Ohio River tributary)
Swauger Valley Run
Bonser Run
Plum Fork
Oven Lick
Dry Run
Frederick Creek
Skull Creek
Falls Creek
Rocky Fork
Long Run
Harrison Furnace Creek
Tattle Creek
Yankee Run
Sweet Run
Higgins Run
McConnel Creek
Bull Creek
Blue Run
Back Run
Buck Run
Fallen Timber Creek
Hunting Run
Owl Creek
Sand Run
Laurel Lick Run
Blue Ash Run
Bear Run
Holland Fork
Bucklick Creek
Little Bucklick Creek
Tattle Creek
Scaffold Lick
Laurel Fork
Buckhorn Creek
Sugarcamp Creek
Jacko Run
Millstone Run
Glade Run
Dry Run
Polecat Creek
McDowell Creek
Brushy Fork

Pine Creek
Pine Creek
Lick Run
Sugar Creek
North Fork Lick Run
Duck Creek
Poplar Fork
Sperry Fork
Union Branch
Little Pine Creek
Darby Creek
Cannons Creek
Cooney Branch
Bear Run
Turkeyfoot Run
Howard Run
Hales Creek
Brady Run
Jackson Fork
Youngs Branch
Brushy Fork
Olive Creek
Afro-American Creek
Painter Creek
Patton Run
Ginat Creek
Gervais Run
Norman Run
Osburn Run
Storms Creek
Little Storms Creek
Hecla Branch
Paddle Fork
Ice Creek
Hog Run
Little Ice Creek
Sugar Creek
Turkey Fork
Ned Fork
Dog Fork
Lick Creek
Salliday Creek
Buffalo Creek

Symmes Creek
Symmes Creek

Raccoon Creek
Raccoon Creek
Little Raccoon Creek
Deer Creek
Indian Creek
Beaver Creek

Leading Creek
Leading Creek

Shade River
Shade River
East Branch Shade River
Middle Branch Shade River
West Branch Shade River

Hocking River
Hocking River
Federal Creek
Margaret Creek
Sunday Creek
Monday Creek
Clear Creek
Rush Creek
Swan Run
Dunfee Run
Sawyer Run

Little Hocking River
Little Hocking River
West Branch Little Hocking River
Laurel Run
Gilbert Run
Burnett Run
Falls Creek
Little West Branch
Mill Branch
East Branch Little Hocking River
Tupper Creek
Davis Creek
Congress Run
Crooked Run
Mile Run
Dodge Run

Muskingum River
Muskingum River
Cat Creek
Big Run
Wolf Creek
Olive Green

Meigs Creek
Meigs Creek
Meigs Creek
Salt Creek
Moxahala Creek

Licking River
Licking River
Licking River
Timber Run
Joes Run
Bartlett Run
Big Run
Poverty Run
Stump Run
Brushy Fork
Rocky Fork
Bowling Green Run
Shawnee Run
North Fork Licking River
Log Pond Run
Dry Creek
Clear Fork Licking River
Dog Hollow Run
North Fork Licking River
 Sycamore Creek
 Tuma Run
 Vance Creek
 Otter Fork Licking River
 Bowl Run
 Webster Run
 Ford Creek
Lake Fork Licking River
Sugar Creek
Reynolds Creek
South Fork Licking River
Raccoon Creek
Lobdell Creek
Moots Run
Simpson Run
Pet Run
Cornell Run
Kiber Run

Wakatomika Creek 

 Wakatomika Creek
 Wakatomika Creek
 Little Wakatomika Creek

Wills Creek
Wills Creek
Salt Fork
Crooked Creek
Leatherwood Creek
Seneca Fork

Tuscarawas River
Tuscarawas River
Stillwater Creek
Little Stillwater Creek
Sugar Creek
Conotton Creek
Huff Run
Beggar Run
Dog Run
Indian Fork
Elliott Run
Dellroy Creek
Messer Run aka Willow Run
Pleasant Valley Run
Cold Spring Run
Town Creek
Gant Creek
Thompson Run
Holmes Run
McGuire Creek
Scott Run
Dining Fork
Irish Creek
Jefferson Creek
Sandy Creek
Nimishillen Creek
Middle Branch Nimishillen Creek
East Branch Nimishillen Creek
West Branch Nimishillen Creek
Indian Run
Little Sandy Creek
Middle Run
Armstrong Run
Pipe Run
Hugle Run
Still Fork
Middle Branch Sandy Creek
Conser Run
Sippo Creek
Newman Creek
Chippewa Creek
Styx River
Wolf Creek

Walhonding River
Walhonding River
Mill Creek
Killbuck Creek

Kokosing River
Kokosing River
North Branch Kokosing River

Mohican River
Mohican River
Lake Fork Mohican River
Muddy Fork Mohican River
Jerome Fork
Black Fork Mohican River
Rocky Fork
Clear Fork Mohican River
Cedar Fork

Duck Creek
Duck Creek
Unnamed Stream
Burch's Run
Afro-American Run
Sugar Creek
Reeds Run
Whipple Run
East Fork Duck Creek
Pawpaw Creek
Middle Fork Duck Creek
Otterslide Creek
Mare Run
Camp Run
Rocky Run
Creighton Run
Road Fork
Flag Run
Schwab Run
Elk Fork
Greasy Run
McBride Run
Barnes Run
West Branch East Fork Duck Creek
Wolfpen Run
West Fork Duck Creek
Goose Hollow
Buffalo Run
Warren Run
Elk Run
Otter Run
Dog Run
Wolf Run
Johnny Woods River
Lick Run

Little Muskingum River
Little Muskingum River
Mill Run
Coal Run
Lick Run
Long Run
Eightmile Creek
Potpie Run
Cow Run
Moss Run
Baker Run
Fifteen Mile Creek
Goss Fork
Deans Fork
Sycamore Fork
Bear Run
Hog Run
Archers Fork
Ward Branch
Coal Run
Cady Run
Jackson Run
Irish Run
Wingett Run
Haught Run
Sackett Run
Tice Run
Wilson Run
Clear Fork
Witten Run
Rias Run
Indian Run
Robinson Run
Death Run
Devoa Run
Oldcamp Run
Straight Fork
Browns Run
Biglick Run
Pigeonroost Run
Rockcamp Run
Laurel Run
Witten Fork
Trail Run
Dogskin Run
Wildcat Run
Dismal Creek
Walnutcamp Run
Alum Run
Millers Fork
Woods Run
Coal Run
Haren Run
Buhrs Run
Wolfpen Run
Town Fork
Rich Fork
Left Prong
Brister Fork
Cranenest Fork
Mutton Run

Sheets Run
Sheets Run
Allen Run
Bells Run
Newell Run
Northup Run
Kerr Run
Bolivian Run
Danas Run
Reynolds Run
Davis Run
Reas Run
Leith Run
Sheets Run
Collins Run
Mill Creek
Jims Run
Miller Run
Deadhorse Run
Parker Run
Barnes Run
Narrows Run
Patton Run
Pool Run
Havely Run
Texas Creek
Bares Run
Fisher Run
Ueltsch Run
Narrows Run
Littman Run
Muhleman Run

Opossum Creek
Opossum Creek
Gilmore Run
Alum Creek
Watkins Fork
Pine Run
Oliver Run
Wildcat Run
Bishop Creek

Sunfish Creek
Sunfish Creek
Afro-American Run
Paine Run
Ackerson Run
Piney Fork
East Fork Piney Fork
Standingstone Run
Death Creek
Baker Fork
Grassy Creek
Wheeler Run
Gardner Run
Stillhouse Run
Blair Run
Big Run

Captina Creek
Captina Creek
Cat Run
Moore Run
Peavine Run
Rocky Fork
Anderson Run
Bend Fork
Millers Run
Joy Fork
Packsaddle Run
Crabapple Creek
Piney Creek
Long Run
Casey Run
Berrys Run
Reeves Hollow
Mikes Run
South Fork Captina Creek
Brushy Creek
Flag Run
Cranenest Creek
Millers Run
Slope Creek
North Fork Captina Creek
Jakes Run
Long Run
Little Captina Creek
Pipe Creek
Big Run
Wegee Creek

McMahon Creek
McMahon Creek
Brooks Run
Trough Run
Rock Run
Little McMahon Creek
Stillhouse Run
Kings Run
Aults Run
Chambers Run
Williams Creek
Welsh Run
Porterfield Run
Hutchison Run
Neffs Run
Anderson Run
Brush Run
Roberts Run
Barcamp Creek
Indian Run
Whiskey Run
Moore Run

Wheeling Creek
Wheeling Creek
Frazier Run
Slaughterhouse Run
Flat Run
McMonies Run
Steep Run
Town Run
Fall Run
Jug Run
Sloan Run
Cox Run
Patton Run
Pogue Run
Loves Run
McCracken Run
Crabapple Creek
Campbell Creek
Ross Run
Glenns Run
Nixon Run
Patton Run
Buckeye Run
Patton Run
Deep Run

Short Creek
Short Creek
Williamson Run
Little Short Creek
Parkers Run
Coal Run
Jug Run
Dry Fork
Piney Fork
Cabbage Fork
Henderson Creek
Thompson Creek
Little Piney Fork
Harrah Run
Long Run
Perrin Run
Goose Run
North Fork Short Creek
Coal Run
Flag Run
Skelley Run
Middle Fork Short Creek
South Fork Short Creek
Little Rush Run
Rush Run
Blues Run
Salt Run
Tarrs Run

Cross Creek
Cross Creek
Dry Fork
McIntyre Creek
Longs Run
Polecat Hollow
Slabcamp Creek
Slab Run
Little McIntyre Creek
Cedar Lick Run
Cedar Lick Creek
Salem Creek
Grassy Run
Lea Branch
North Branch Cross Creek
Wells Run
Permars Run
Wills Creek
Rush Run
Cedar Creek
North Fork Wills Creek
Island Creek
Little Island Creek
Hale Run
Shelley Run
Croxton Run
Jeremy Run
Goose Run
Brimstone Run

Yellow Creek
Yellow Creek
Rocky Run
Hollow Rock Run
Tarburner Run
Carter Run
North Fork Yellow Creek
Dry Run
Salt Run
Salibury Run
Nancy Run
Roses Run
Riley Run
Brush Creek
Dennis Run
Roach Run
Lowery Run
Town Fork
Dry Run
Culp Run
Rippy Run
Long Run
Hildebrand Run
Roach Run
Ralston Run
Mathews Run
Upper North Fork Yellow Creek
Hump Run
Burgett Run
Carroll Run
Hazel Run
Elkhorn Creek
Strawcamp Run
Center Fork Elkhorn Creek
Trail Run
Frog Run
Wolf Creek
Cox Creek
Goose Creek
Elk Fork
Elk Lick
McQueen Run
Little Yellow Creek
Alder Lick Run
Wells Run
California Hollow

Little Beaver Creek
Little Beaver Creek
Island Run
Bieler Run
North Fork Little Beaver Creek
Pine Run
Brush Run
Bull Creek
Leslie Run
Little Bull Creek
Turkey Run
Coalbank Run
Painters Run
Dilworth Run
McCautry Run
Jordan Run
Madden Run
Beaverdam Run
Honey Creek
Harman Run
Rough Run
Longs Run
Middle Fork Little Beaver Creek
Turkeyfoot Run
Pine Run
Elk Run
Middle Run
Stone Mill Run
East Branch Middle Fork Little Beaver Creek
Cherry Valley Run
West Fork Little Beaver Creek
Patterson Creek
Peters Run
Brush Creek
McCormick Run
Big Creek
Williard Run
Cold Run

Mahoning River
Mahoning River
Hickory Creek
Coffee Run
Grays Run
Hines Run
Godward Run
Yellow Creek
Mill Creek
Burgess Run
Pine Hollow Creek
Dry Run
Crab Creek
Kimmel Brook
Mill Creek
Bears Den Run
Ax Factory Run
Andersons Run
Cranberry Run
Indian Run
Saw Mill Run
Turkey Creek
Fourmile Run
Squaw Creek
Meander Creek
Morrison Creek
Sawmill Creek
West Branch Meander Creek
Mosquito Creek
Spring Run
Big Run
Confusion Run
Walnut Creek
Mud Creek
Smith Run
Mud Creek
Red Run
Duck Creek
Little Duck Creek
East Branch Duck Creek
Chocolate Run
Eagle Creek
Tinker Creek
Nelson Ditch
South Fork Eagle Creek
Sand Creek
Camp Creek
Silver Creek
Black Creek
West Branch Mahoning River
Silver Creek
Hinkley Creek
Bixon Creek
Barrel Run
Harmon Brook
Kale Creek
Charley Run Creek
Mill Creek
Turkey Broth Creek
Island Creek
Willow Creek
Deer Creek
Beech Creek
Little Beech Creek
Fish Creek
Beaver Run

Shenango River
Shenango River
Deer Creek
Little Yankee Creek
Little Deer Creek
Yankee Creek
South Branch Yankee Run
Pymatuning Creek
Booth Run
Mill Creek
Stratton Creek
Maple Creek
Sugar Creek
Berry Creek
Clear Creek
Sugar Run
McMichael Creek
Black Creek
Gravel Run

See also

List of rivers in the United States

References

External links

Ohio
 
Rivers